Lokys is an abandoned (according to the 2001 Lithuania Census.) village in Šilai eldership, Jonava district municipality, several kilometers north-east of Jonava, by the Lokys River.

References

Villages in Jonava District Municipality